James, Jimmy or Jim Black may refer to:

Sportsmen
 James Black (cricketer) (1873–1920), New Zealand cricketer 
 James Black (ice hockey) (born 1969), former NHL hockey player
 Jim Black (footballer) (born 1943), Scottish footballer
 Jimmy Black (footballer) (1899–1933), Scottish football defender
 James Black (hurler) (born 1992), Northern Irish hurler
 Jimmy Black (basketball) (born 1960), American basketball player
 James Black (defensive end) (1956–2018), American football defensive end

Politicians
 James Black (congressman) (1793–1872), U.S. Congressman from Pennsylvania
 James Black (prohibitionist) (1823–1893), American temperance movement leader and first Presidential candidate of the Prohibition Party
 James A. Black (1793–1848), U.S. Representative from South Carolina
 James B. Black (born 1935), Speaker of the North Carolina House of Representatives, 1999–2006
 James C. C. Black (1842–1928), U.S. Congressman from Georgia and Confederate Army veteran
 James D. Black (1849–1938), governor of Kentucky for part of 1919

Musicians, artists and entertainers
 James Milton Black (1856–1938), American hymn composer
 James Black (guitarist) (born 1975), Canadian guitarist in the band Finger Eleven
 Jimmy Carl Black (1938–2008), American drummer and vocalist for the Mothers of Invention
 James R. Black (born 1962), American actor and former professional American football player
 Jim Black (born 1967), American jazz musician
 James N. Black (1940–1988), American jazz drummer
 James Black, Australian guitarist and keyboard player formerly with Mondo Rock and The Black Sorrows

Religious figures
 James Black (bishop) (1894–1968), first bishop of Paisley, Scotland
 James Black (clergyman) (1797–1886), Scottish-born clergyman in Canada
 James Black (Moderator) (1879–1948), moderator of the General Assembly of the Church of Scotland in 1938–1939

Doctors and scientists
 James Black (pharmacologist) (1924–2010), British doctor and pharmacologist, winner of the Nobel Prize for Medicine
 James Gow Black (1835–1914), New Zealand chemist, mineralogist, lecturer and university professor
 James Black (scientist) (1787–1867), English scientist who published "An Inquiry into the Capillary Circulation of Blood" in 1825
 James R. Black (scientist), researcher in electromigration and for whom Black's equation is named
 James F. Black (1919–1988), senior scientist at Exxon who reported the impact of fossil fuels on climate to company executives

Others
 James Black (blacksmith) (1800–1872), creator of the Bowie knife
 James Wallace Black (1825–1896), American photographer
 James Black (educator) (1826–1890), President of the University of Iowa, 1868–1870
 James Black (Case Closed), a character from Case Closed

See also
 Jim Blacker (born 1945), English footballer